The list of ship launches in 1801 includes a chronological list of some ships launched in 1801.



References

1801
Ship launches